Jacques-Hyacinthe Serry (1659–1738) was a French Dominican Thomist theologian, controversialist and historian.

At the University of Padua from 1698, he taught theology based more closely on Biblical and patristic authority.

Under the pseudonym Augustinus Leblanc, he wrote the standard history Historiae Congregationum de Auxiliis Divinae Gratiae of the Congregatio de Auxiliis, and the Dominican-Jesuit controversy on grace that led to its being set up. The work itself is partisan, awarding a Dominican victory based on an unpublished text, but well-documented. It was attacked by the Jesuit Livinus de Meyer, writing as Theodorus Eleutherius, in 1705, in his Historiae controversiarum de divinae gratiae auxiliis.

Notes

External links
 Free books by Jacques-Hyacinthe Serry on Google Books

1659 births
1738 deaths
18th-century French Catholic theologians
French Dominicans
Academic staff of the University of Padua